Pepita; or, the Girl with the Glass Eyes, based on a story by E. T. A. Hoffmann, is a comic opera in three acts written by Alfred Thompson and composed by Edward Solomon. The opera was produced and directed by Thompson and Solomon and debuted at the Union Square Theatre, New York, then under the management of J. M. Hill, on March 16, 1886, and closed after a nine-week run on May 22.

Principal roles and original cast
Sources:

Pepita, Professor Pongo's Daughter .. Lillian Russell
Don Pablo, the governor's son and heir .. Chauncey Olcott/ G. Taglieri 
Professor Pongo, Doctor of Sciences . . Jacques Kruger
Donna Carmansuita, Directress of Seminary for Young Ladies .. Alma Stuart Stanley 
Don Giavolo, Governor of Scaliwaxico .... Fred Clifton
Don Juan, Pablo's inevitable friend  ..  George Wilkinson
Curaso, valet to Pablo ..  Frederick  Solomon
Pasquela, a forward pupil .. Lizzie Hughes
Maraquita, an advanced idem .. Clara Jackson
Chiquita, a prominent ditto .. Cora Striker
Juana, a maid in waiting .. Julia Wilson
Ballet Coryphée .. Miles. Pasta, S. Watson/ Forstner Atkins.

Synopsis
Setting: The City Of Scaliwaxico.
Time—High Old. Period—Uncertain.
ACT I.—The Students' Frolic. Before Professor Pongo's House in Scaliwaxico.
ACT II.—The Professor's Prodigy. Interior of Pongo's Sanctum.
ACT III.—The Governor's Fete. Don Giavolo's Palace. In this scene will appear The Mechanical Waiters and The Humming Birds.

Plot
Professor Pongo is obsessed with automata, as is Governor Giavolo. Pepita, the professor's daughter and Pablo, the governor's son, are in love. Her father disapproves and Pablo is forbidden to visit. To gain entry past her father, Pablo disguises himself as one of the cadavers Pongo planned to use to augment his mechanical devices. That night when Giavolo paid Pongo a visit, curious to view his mechanisms, neither knew that two of the automatons entertaining them were actually Pepita and Pablo concealed inside.

References

1886 plays
1886 operas
1886 in music
Operas based on works by E. T. A. Hoffmann